Halifax Centre was a provincial electoral district in Nova Scotia, Canada, that elected one member of the Nova Scotia House of Assembly. It existed from 1933 to 1967.

Election results

1933 general election

1937 general election

1941 general election

1945 general election

1949 general election

1953 general election

1956 general election

1960 general election

1963 general election

References
Elections Nova Scotia - Summary Results from 1867 to 2011 (PDF) 

Former provincial electoral districts of Nova Scotia